Sande Cohen (born 1946, in San Francisco, California) is a historian and a professor emeritus from the School of  Critical Studies at the California Institute for the Arts. His teaching focused on history and historiography.

Cohen received a B.A. (1969) and M.A. (1970) from San Francisco State University and a Ph.D. (1976) in history from UCLA. Among his publications are: 
History Out of Joint: Essays on the Use and Abuse of History, Johns Hopkins Press, 2006. 
Historical Culture (1986, UC Press)
Academia and the Luster of Capital (Minnesota, 1993)

A special issue of the journal Rethinking History (v. 12, 2008) published essays on Cohen's writings.

References

1946 births
Living people
San Francisco State University alumni
University of California, Los Angeles alumni
21st-century American historians
21st-century American male writers
American male non-fiction writers